The B'nai Moshe ("Children of Moses"), also known as Inca Jews, are a small group of several hundred converts to Judaism originally from the city of Trujillo, Peru, to the north of the capital city Lima. Judaism moved to the south into Arequipa and to others populated cities like Piura.

Most B'nai Moshe now live in the West Bank, mostly in Kfar Tapuach along with Yemenite Jews, Russian Jews and others.

"Inca Jews"
While Inca Jews is not the community's official designation, it is popular outside the community and is derived from the fact that they can trace descent from Peru's indigenous Amerindian people, although mostly in the form of mestizos (persons of mixed Spanish, Amerindian descent, and Spanish Jewish ancestors) and the association of that country's native population with the Incas.

History
The community was founded in 1966 by a local man of Trujillo named Segundo Villanueva, who faced great exclusion and prejudice in his native city as a result of his decision to convert from the Catholic Church to Judaism. Villanueva had visited Spain for a time, learning from the local Sephardic community, and upon his return, taught around 500 former Catholics in Trujillo about Judaism, igniting a spark which would ultimately lead to their conversion to Judaism and joining the Jewish people.

Conversion and aliyah
In 1985, Villanueva made contact with the Lubavitcher Rebbe, who sent Rabbi Myron Zuber to Peru to help with their formal conversions. In 1988, Zuber arrived in Peru and aided the converts in matters such as how to properly observe kashrut and Shabbat.

As a result of the Lima community's continuing reluctance, it was eventually decided that the B'nai Moshe could not reach their full potential in Peru, and decided that they make aliyah (emigration) to Israel once converted. A Beit Din initially performed formal conversions for about 300 members of the community in 1991, almost all of whom emigrated to Israel, who were followed by an additional 200 several years later. A community of around 30 B'nai Moshe moved to Lima at the same time. Another 84 were formally converted in 2001.

See also
History of the Jews in Peru
Peruvian Jews in Israel
Amazonian Jews
Jewish ethnic divisions
Mestizos
Amerindians
Incas

References

Kulanu organisation

The Prophet of the Andes by Graciela Mochkofsky

Inca
Jewish organizations established in 1966
Peruvian Jews
Groups who converted to Judaism
Jewish Peruvian history
Converts to Judaism from Roman Catholicism

he:יהדות פרו#בני משה